Schule am Meer, Engl. School by the Sea, Hebrew בית ספר ליד הים, also known as S.a.M. or SaM, was a private, holistically oriented coed progressive boarding school on the East Frisian island of Juist in the Free State of Prussia of German Reich, located between Wadden Sea and North Sea.

The boarding school was operated by Stiftung Schule am Meer, a private foundation whose board of trustees consisted of the Swiss educator  (1884–1961), the Austrian painter Fritz Hafner, the German industrialist, art collector and patron of the arts Alfred Hess from Erfurt in Thuringia, the progressive educator Martin Luserke from Berlin, the social scientist Elisabeth Jaffé, née Freiin von Richthofen originating from Lorraine, and the chemist  (1886–1932) from Nuremberg in Franconia. Aeschlimann, Hafner, Luserke and Reiner were active teachers at S.a.M. and among the school's founders. The foundation got co-financed by the Prussian state. Still most funds had to be brought up by the board of trustees, by the student's parents via tuition payments, by monetary donations or contributions in kind. Most musical instruments of the boarding school got donated by Robert Wichard Pohl, a Steinway grand piano was donated by Paul Reiner's wife  (1891–1972), née Hochschild, a qualified nurse helper who also acted as a substitute teacher for the elementary/primary and the intermediate/lower secondary level.

Schule am Meer was the first progressive school in Germany to be set up on an island in the sea. It is considered the first regular German open air school, which from grade 5 to grade 13 led to graduation (Reifeprüfung, Abitur). Due to its open air status, in some cases it was chosen by parents of children and youth with health issues like bronchial asthma, which for instance affected the Austrian mountaineer and S.a.M. student Ulrich Sild (1911–1937) from Vienna who graduated at Schule am Meer in March 1931.

It was the only German school that built its own free-standing theatre hall in 1930/31, right during Great Depression, which was also intended to train amateur play teachers throughout German Reich. This and the remaining other large building Arche (= Arch) of the former school today are due to demolition.

In contrast to most state-run schools, it placed a special emphasis on training its students in the visual and performing arts, sports, crafts and gardening. It also considered scientific, artistic and sporting subjects as of equal value.

The boarding school existed from the beginning of May 1925 to the end of March 1934 and quickly developed some national reputation, amongst others by its orchestra and choir, both founded and conducted by the most talented concert pianist, composer and music educator Eduard Zuckmayer, but most notably by its stage play.

It got support by senior guest students and teachers from England, France and the United States, especially for language classes and stage plays, the latter performed in German, English and French.

Among other visitors had been progressive Protestant educator  (1877–1955) with his students.

Schule am Meer was practicing "grassroots democracy" with a tendency to non-hierarchical structures. Students and teachers were considered as of equal rights and duties. Students actively helped shape the lessons. All individuals of the Schulgemeinde (= school community), which acted as the boarding school's "legislative council" participated in a shared decision-making process. Comradeships, the subdivisions of the community were formed out of about ten students of different age and sex, not related to classes in any way. As a leader of each comradeship, a teacher was characterized as "primus inter pares" and got addressed either by first name or nickname, the latter sometimes an abbreviation or a cacography of the teacher's surname. Those comradeships were named as Bears, Bulls, Dolphins, Foals, Seals, Penguins, Pinnipeds, Vultures and Wolves, created their logos and raised their own pennants. The comradeships turned out similar to a family-like structure, out of which most life-lasting friendships between many of the students and teachers emerged.

The boarding school was closed due to Nazi "Gleichschaltung" and state-run anti-Semitism, forcibly carried out by the islanders of Juist who already denounced the boarding school as Jewish since its foundation in 1925. Several of the students and their parents as well as some teachers had to emigrate from Nazi Germany due to political or anti-Semitic prosecution. They went to North and South America, South Africa, Mandatory Palestine, Spain, France, England, Switzerland and other places, where several of them were able to make an encyclopedically relevant career in the industry, in sciences, in the arts, in photography or in journalism. All of them spread the word and shared their memories about a unique boarding school on a remote island in the sea.

Related people (selection) 
The following list is focussing on those related people who got a biography at the English Wikipedia, so it is no representative cross section, but already containing major names.
 Bruno Ahrends (1878–1948), architect and S.a.M. parent
  (1920–2008), S.a.M. student
  (1892–1951), progressive educator, S.a.M. parent, founder of German, Swiss and US boarding schools, see Windsor Mountain School
  (1911–1996), S.a.M. graduate
 Eugen Diederichs (1867–1930), publisher, S.a.M. sponsor
 Dr. Alfred Döblin, MD (1878–1957), psychologist, writer and S.a.M. parent
 Adolphe Ferrière (1879–1960), Swiss progressive educator
 Hans Freyer (1887–1969), sociologist, historian and philosopher
 Adolf Grimme (1889–1963), politician, Prussian Minister of Science, Art and Education, S.a.M. sponsor
 Fritz Hafner (1877–1969), S.a.M. teacher
 Heinz Friedrich Hartig (1907–1969), S.a.M. teacher
  (1876–1946), linguist (English studies), Shakespeare expert, held lectures at S.a.M.
 Alfred Hess (1879–1931), industrialist, art collector, patron of the arts, S.a.M.  parent, S.a.M. foundation board of trustees
 Hans Hess (1907–1975), S.a.M. student
 Dr. Elisabeth Jaffé (1874–1973), sociologist, S.a.M. foundation board of trustees
 Adolf Köster (1883–1930), German minister of the Exterior, German minister of the Interior, ambassador and S.a.M. parent
 Hedda Korsch (1890–1982), co-founder of the Communist Party of Germany (KPD), educationalist, who temporarily taught at S.a.M.
 Beate Köstlin (1919–2001), S.a.M. student
 Walter Georg Kühne (1911–1991), S.a.M. graduate
 Felicitas Kestner (1914–2001), S.a.M. student
 Ernst Kurth (1886–1946), Swiss music theorist
 Paula Ludwig, Austrian-German poet and S.a.M. parent
 Martin Luserke (1880–1968), S.a.M. headmaster, theatermaker, writer, bard
 Heinrich Meyer (1904–1977), S.a.M. teacher
 Rolf Pappiér (1914–1998), S.a.M. graduate
 Robert Wichard Pohl (1884–1976), physicist, S.a.M. sponsor
 Jørgen Skafte Rasmussen (1878–1964), Danish engineer, industrialist and S.a.M. parent
  (1910–1998), S.a.M. graduate
 Christian Rohlfs (1849–1938), expressionist painter and printmaker, S.a.M. sponsor
 Ludwig Roselius (1874–1943), coffee merchant, art collector and patron of the arts, S.a.M. sponsor
 Prof. Dr. Alfred Weber (1868–1958), economist, geographer, sociologist and theoretician of culture
 Carl Zuckmayer (1896–1977), writer and playwright, visited and cooperated temporarily with his older brother Eduard and Luserke at S.a.M.
 Eduard Zuckmayer (1890–1972), S.a.M. musician

References 

Progressive education
Co-educational boarding schools
Weimar Republic
Boarding schools in Germany
Private schools in Germany
Schools in Lower Saxony
Juist
Educational institutions established in the 1920s
Educational institutions disestablished in the 1930s